Oroszló is a village in Baranya county, Hungary.

Etymology
The name comes from a Slavic personal name Zorislav.  1402/1406 Zoroslow.

References

Populated places in Baranya County